Alice Lee Roosevelt Longworth (February 12, 1884 – February 20, 1980) was an American writer and socialite. She was the eldest child of U.S. president Theodore Roosevelt and his only child with his first wife, Alice Hathaway Lee Roosevelt. Longworth led an unconventional and controversial life. Her marriage to Representative Nicholas Longworth III, a Republican Party leader and 38th Speaker of the U.S. House of Representatives, was shaky, and her only child, Paulina, was from her affair with Senator William Borah.

Childhood

Alice Lee Roosevelt was born in the Roosevelt family home at 6 West 57th St. in Manhattan, New York on February 12, 1884. Her mother, Alice Hathaway Lee Roosevelt, was a Boston banking heiress. Her father, Theodore, was then a New York State Assemblyman. As an Oyster Bay Roosevelt, Alice was a descendant of the Schuyler family.

Two days after her birth, in the same house, her mother died of undiagnosed kidney failure. Eleven hours earlier that day, Theodore's mother, Martha Stewart "Mittie" Bulloch, had also died, of typhoid fever.

Theodore was rendered so distraught by his wife's death that he could not bear to think about her. He almost never spoke of her again, would not allow her to be mentioned in his presence, and even omitted her name from his autobiography. Therefore, his daughter Alice was called "Baby Lee" instead of by her first name. She continued this practice late in life, often preferring to be called "Mrs. L" rather than "Alice".

Seeking solace, Theodore retreated from his life in New York and headed west, where he spent two years traveling and living on his ranch in North Dakota. He left his infant daughter in the care of his sister Anna, known as "Bamie" or "Bye". Letters to Bamie reveal Theodore's concern for his daughter. In one 1884 letter, he wrote, "I hope Mousiekins will be very cunning, I shall dearly love her."

Bamie had a significant influence on young Alice, who would later speak of her admiringly: "If auntie Bye had been a man, she would have been president." Bamie took her under her watchful care, moving Alice into her book-filled Manhattan house, until Theodore married again.

After Theodore married Edith Kermit Carow on December 2, 1886, Alice was raised by her father and stepmother. Through this marriage, Alice had five half-siblings: Theodore III (Ted), Kermit, Ethel, Archie, and Quentin. Theodore remained married to Edith until his death in 1919. During much of Alice's childhood, Bamie was a remote figure who eventually married and moved to London for a time. As Alice later became more independent and came into conflict with her father and stepmother, Aunt "Bye" provided needed structure and stability. Late in life, she said of her aunt: "There is always someone in every family who keeps it together. In ours, it was Auntie Bye."

Relationship with stepmother 
 

There were tensions in the relationship between young Alice and her stepmother Edith, who had known her husband's previous wife and made it clear that she regarded her predecessor as a beautiful, but insipid, childlike fool. Edith once angrily told her that if Alice Hathaway Lee had lived, she would have bored Theodore to death.

Continuing tension with her stepmother and prolonged separation and limited attention from her father created a young woman who was independent, outgoing, and self-confident. When her father was Governor of New York, he and his wife proposed that Alice attend a conservative school for girls in New York City. In response, Alice wrote, "If you send me I will humiliate you. I will do something that will shame you. I tell you I will."

In later years, Alice expressed admiration for her stepmother's sense of humor and stated that they had shared similar literary tastes. In her autobiography Crowded Hours, Alice wrote of Edith Carow, "That I was the child of another marriage was a simple fact and made a situation that had to be coped with, and Mother coped with it with a fairness and charm and intelligence which she has to a greater degree than almost any one else I know."

Father's presidency

Following the 1901 assassination of President William McKinley in Buffalo, her father took office, an event that she greeted with "sheer rapture". Alice became a celebrity and fashion icon at age 17, and at her social debut in 1902 she wore a gown of what became known as "Alice blue", sparking a color trend in women's clothing, and a popular song, "Alice Blue Gown".

Public conduct
Alice was the center of attention in the social context of her father's presidency, and she thrived on the attention, even as she chafed at some of the restrictions such attention placed on her. In this, Alice resembled her father. She later said of Theodore, "He wants to be the bride at every wedding, the corpse at every funeral, and the baby at every christening." Her outspokenness and antics won the hearts of the American people, who nicknamed her "Princess Alice".

Alice was known for breaking many social norms of her era. The Journal des débats in Paris noted that in 15 months Alice Roosevelt had attended 407 dinners, 350 balls, and 300 parties. One paper alleged that she had stripped down to her lingerie at a drunken orgy held at a Newport, Rhode Island, mansion, and danced atop a table, a story that proved to be false. She smoked cigarettes in public, rode in cars with men, stayed out late partying, kept a pet snake named Emily Spinach (Emily after her spinster aunt and Spinach for its green color) in the White House, and was seen placing bets with a bookie.

On May 11, 1908, Alice amused herself in the Capitol's gallery at the House of Representatives by placing a tack on the chair of an unknown but "middle-aged" and "dignified" gentleman. Upon encountering the tack, "like the burst of a bubble on the fountain, like the bolt from the blue, like the ball from the cannon," the unfortunate fellow leapt up in pain and surprise while she looked away.

Once, a White House visitor commented on Alice's frequent interruptions to the Oval Office, often to offer political advice. The exhausted president commented to his friend, author Owen Wister, after she interrupted their conversation for the third time and he threatened to throw her "out the window", "I can either run the country or I can attend to Alice, but I cannot possibly do both."

Tour of Asia

In 1905, Alice, along with her father's Secretary of War, William Howard Taft, led the American delegation to Japan, Hawaii, China, the Philippines, and Korea. It was the largest such diplomatic mission thus far, composed of 23 congressmen (including her future husband Nicholas Longworth), seven senators, diplomats, officials, and businessmen.

During the cruise to Japan, Alice jumped into the ship's swimming pool fully clothed, and coaxed Congressman William Bourke Cockran to join her in the water. Putting a romantic spin on the story, newspapers reported it was Longworth, to whom Alice was engaged. Years later Bobby Kennedy would chide her about the incident, saying it was outrageous for the time, to which the by-then-octogenarian Alice replied that it would only have been outrageous had she removed her clothes. In her autobiography, Crowded Hours, Alice made note of the event, pointing out that there was little difference between the linen skirt and blouse she had been wearing and a lady's swimsuit of the period.

Married life

In December 1905, after returning to Washington from their diplomatic travels, Alice became engaged to Nicholas Longworth III, a Republican U.S. House of Representatives member from Cincinnati, Ohio, who ultimately would rise to become Speaker of the House. Alice would become 22 years old in two months. The two had traveled in the same social circles for several years, but their relationship solidified during the Imperial Cruise. A scion of a socially prominent Ohio family, Longworth was 14 years her senior and had a reputation as a Washington D.C. playboy. 

Their wedding took place in February 1906 and was the social event of the season. It was attended by more than a thousand guests with many thousands gathered outside hoping for a glimpse of the bride. She wore a blue wedding dress and dramatically cut the wedding cake with a sword (borrowed from a military aide attending the reception). Immediately after the wedding, the couple left for a honeymoon that included a voyage to Cuba and a visit to the Longworths in Cincinnati. This was followed by travels to England and the Continent which included having dinners with King Edward VII of the United Kingdom, Kaiser Wilhelm II of Germany, Georges Clemenceau, Whitelaw Reid, Lord Curzon, and William Jennings Bryan. They bought a house at 2009 Massachusetts Avenue, N.W., in Washington, D.C., now the headquarters of the Washington Legal Foundation.

Alice publicly supported her father's Bull Moose presidential candidacy in the 1912 presidential election, while her husband stayed loyal to his mentor, President William Howard Taft, and was running for reelection on the Republican ticket. Nicholas Longworth narrowly lost his House seat that year to Democratic challenger Stanley E. Bowdle.

During that election cycle, Alice appeared on stage with her father's vice presidential candidate, Hiram Johnson, in Longworth's own district. Longworth lost by about 105 votes and she joked that she was worth at least 100 votes (meaning she was the reason he lost). However, Nicholas Longworth was elected again in 1914 and stayed in the House for the rest of his life.  Alice's campaign against her husband caused a permanent chill in their marriage. 

During their marriage, Alice carried on numerous affairs. It was general knowledge in D.C. that she had a long, ongoing affair with Senator William Borah.  When Alice's diaries were opened to historical research they indicated that Borah was the father of her daughter, Paulina Longworth (1925–1957).

Alice was renowned for her "brilliantly malicious" humor, even in this sensitive situation, since she had originally wanted to name her daughter "Deborah," as in "de Borah." And according to one family friend, "everybody called her [Paulina] 'Aurora Borah Alice.'"

Post-Roosevelt presidency

When it came time for the Roosevelt family to move out of the White House, Alice buried a Voodoo doll of the new First Lady, Nellie Taft, in the front yard. Later, the Taft White House barred her from her former residence—the first but not the last administration to do so. During Woodrow Wilson's administration (which barred her in 1916 for a bawdy joke at Wilson's expense), Alice worked against the entry of the United States into the League of Nations.

During the Great Depression, when she, like many other Americans, found her fortunes reversed, Alice appeared in tobacco advertisements to earn money. She also published an autobiography, Crowded Hours. The book sold well and received rave reviews. Time praised its "insouciant vitality."

Alice's wit could have political effects on friend and foe alike. When columnist and cousin Joseph Wright Alsop V claimed that there was grass-roots support for Republican presidential candidate Wendell Willkie, the Republican hope to defeat FDR in 1940, she said yes, "the grass roots of 10,000 country clubs." During the 1940 presidential campaign, she publicly proclaimed that she'd "rather vote for Hitler than vote for Franklin for a third term." Alice demolished Thomas Dewey, the 1944 opponent of her cousin Franklin, by comparing the pencil-mustached Republican to "the bridegroom on the wedding cake". The image stuck and Governor Dewey lost two consecutive presidential elections.

Paulina Longworth married Alexander McCormick Sturm, with whom she had a daughter, Joanna (b. July 9, 1946). Alexander died in 1951. Paulina herself died in 1957 from an overdose of sleeping pills.

Not very long before Paulina's death, she and Alice had discussed the care of Joanna in case of such an event. Alice fought for and won the custody of her granddaughter, whom she raised. In contrast to Alice's relationship with her daughter, she doted on her granddaughter, and the two were very close. In an article in American Heritage in 1969, Joanna was described as a "highly attractive and intellectual twenty-two-year-old" and was called "a notable contributor to Mrs. Longworth’s youthfulness.... The bonds between them are twin cables of devotion and a healthy respect for each other's tongue. 'Mrs. L.,' says a friend, 'has been a wonderful father and mother to Joanna: mostly father.'"

Political connections

From an early age, Alice was interested in politics. When advancing age and illness incapacitated her Aunt Bamie, Alice stepped into her place as an unofficial political adviser to her father. She warned her father against challenging the renomination of William Howard Taft in 1912.

Alice took a hard-line view of the Democrats and in her youth sympathized with the conservative wing of the Republican Party. She supported her half-brother Theodore Roosevelt Jr. when he ran for governor of New York in 1924. When Franklin D. Roosevelt ran for president in 1932, Alice publicly opposed his candidacy. Writing in the Ladies' Home Journal in October 1932, she said of FDR, "Politically, his branch of the family and ours have always been in different camps, and the same surname is about all we have in common..... I am a Republican..... I am going to vote for Hoover..... If I were not a Republican, I would still vote for Mr. Hoover this time."

Although Alice did not support John F. Kennedy in the 1960 election, she became very enamored of the Kennedy family and "learned how amusing and attractive Democrats could be." She developed an affectionate, although sometimes strained, friendship with Bobby Kennedy, perhaps because of his relatively thin skin. When Alice privately made fun of his scaling the newly named Mount Kennedy in Canada, he was not amused. She even admitted to voting for President Lyndon Johnson over Senator Barry Goldwater in 1964 because she believed Goldwater was too mean.

Alice developed a genuine friendship with Richard Nixon when he was Vice President. In 1957 he served as a pallbearer at Paulina's funeral. When he returned to California after Dwight Eisenhower's second term and his loss in the 1960 presidential election, she kept in touch and did not consider his political career to be over. Alice encouraged Nixon to reenter politics and continued to invite him to her famous dinners. Nixon returned these favors by inviting her to his first formal White House dinner and to the 1971 wedding of his daughter Tricia Nixon.

Later life

In 1955, Alice fell and suffered a broken hip. In 1956, she was diagnosed with breast cancer, and though she successfully underwent a mastectomy at the time, cancer was found in her other breast in 1970, requiring a second mastectomy.

Alice was a lifelong member of the Republican Party, but her political sympathies began to change when she became close to the Kennedy family and Lyndon Johnson. She voted Democratic in 1964 and was known to be supporting Bobby Kennedy in the 1968 Democratic primary.

After Robert F. Kennedy was assassinated in 1968, Alice again supported her friend Richard Nixon in the 1968 and 1972 elections, just as she had done in his 1960 campaign against John F. Kennedy. She was recorded in a telephone conversation with Nixon in the Nixon White House tapes sharply criticizing the 1972 Democratic nominee George McGovern. Nixon called her "the most interesting [conversationalist of the age]" and said, "No one, no matter how famous, could ever outshine her."

She remained cordial with Nixon's successor, Gerald Ford, but a perceived lack of social grace on the part of Jimmy Carter caused her to decline to ever meet him, the last sitting president in her lifetime. In the official statement marking her death, President Carter wrote "She had style, she had grace, and she had a sense of humor that kept generations of political newcomers to Washington wondering which was worse—to be skewered by her wit or to be ignored by her."

Death
After many years of ill health, Alice died in her Embassy Row house on February 20, 1980, eight days after her 96th birthday, of emphysema and pneumonia, with contributory effects of a number of other chronic illnesses. She is buried in Rock Creek Cemetery, Washington, D.C. She is the longest-lived child of a US President.

Wit
Of her quotable comments, Alice's most famous found its way onto a pillow on her settee: "If you can't say something good about someone, sit right here by me." To Senator Joseph McCarthy, who had jokingly remarked at a party "Here's my blind date. I am going to call you Alice," she sarcastically said "Senator McCarthy, you are not going to call me Alice. The truckman, the trashman and the policeman on my block may call me Alice, but you may not." She informed President Lyndon B. Johnson that she wore wide-brimmed hats so he couldn't kiss her. When a well-known Washington senator was discovered to have been having an affair with a young woman less than half his age, she quipped, "You can't make a soufflé rise twice."  She said in a 60 Minutes interview with Eric Sevareid, televised on February 17, 1974, that she was a hedonist.

See also
 Alice blue

Citations

General bibliography

Books 
 Brough, James. Princess Alice: A Biography of Alice Roosevelt Longworth. Boston: Little, Brown. 1975.
 Caroli, Betty Boyd. The Roosevelt Women. New York: Basic Books, 1998.
 Cordery, Stacy A. Alice: Alice Roosevelt Longworth, from White House Princess to Washington Power Broker. New York: Viking, 2007.
 Felsenthal, Carol. Princess Alice: The Life and Times of Alice Roosevelt Longworth. New York: St. Martin's Press. 1988.
 Longworth, Alice Roosevelt. Crowded Hours (Autobiography). New York: Scribners. 1933.
 Miller, Nathan. Theodore Roosevelt: A Life. William Morrow, 1992,
 
 
 
 Teichmann, Howard. Alice: The Life and Times of Alice Roosevelt Longworth. Englewood Cliffs, NJ. 1979.
 Wead, Doug. All the Presidents' Children: Triumph and Tragedy in the Lives of America's First Families. New York: Atria Books, 2004.

Articles
 Marquis James (pseud. Quid), "Princess Alice" , The New Yorker 1/2 (February 28, 1925): 9–10. (Profile.)

Further reading

External links

 New York Times book review of Conversations with Mrs. L in August 1981
 Almanac of Theodore Roosevelt: "Alice Roosevelt Longworth" 
 
 Alice Roosevelt Longworth portrait in the 1920s by Nickolas Muray
 Interview with Dr. Stacy Cordery author of Alice: Alice Roosevelt Longworth, from White House Princess to Washington Power Broker

1884 births
1980 deaths
20th-century American non-fiction writers
20th-century American women writers
American autobiographers
American socialites
American women non-fiction writers
Bulloch family
Burials at Rock Creek Cemetery
Children of presidents of the United States
Children of vice presidents of the United States
Deaths from emphysema
Deaths from pneumonia in Washington, D.C.
New York (state) Republicans
Roosevelt family
Schuyler family
Spouses of Ohio politicians
Washington, D.C., Republicans
Women autobiographers
Writers from New York City
Longworth family